Le Pin (French for the pine) is the name or part of the name of several communes in France:

Le Pin, Allier, in the Allier département 
Le Pin, Calvados, in the Calvados département 
Le Pin, Charente-Maritime, in the Charente-Maritime département
Le Pin, Deux-Sèvres, in the Deux-Sèvres département
Le Pin, Gard, in the Gard département 
Le Pin, Isère, in the Isère département 
Le Pin, Jura, in the Jura département 
Le Pin, Loire-Atlantique, in the Loire-Atlantique département 
Le Pin, Seine-et-Marne, in the Seine-et-Marne département 
Le Pin, Tarn-et-Garonne, in the Tarn-et-Garonne département
Le Pin-au-Haras, in the Orne département 
Le Pin-en-Mauges, in the Maine-et-Loire département 
Le Pin-la-Garenne, in the Orne département 
Le Pin-Murelet, in the Haute-Garonne département

Other uses 
Château Le Pin, a winery in the Gironde département, commune and appellation of Pomerol